Seattle Foundation is the community foundation serving the greater Seattle area. Established in 1946, it is the oldest community foundation serving the Pacific Northwest, with assets of more than $965 million. As of 2017, it was the 21st largest community foundation in the United States.

Mission 
Seattle Foundation has declared their mission is to be a charitable foundation which "ignites powerful, rewarding philanthropy to make Greater Seattle a stronger, more vibrant community for all."

Services
Under the leadership of its president and CEO Tony Mestres, Seattle Foundation offers an array of philanthropic services, including collective grant-making and impact investing. In 2013, the foundation awarded grants of more than $65 million. It has worked with Seattle and King County, Washington lawmakers on civic initiatives to increase voter turnout and provide services to immigrants and refugees.

GiveBIG 
Seattle Foundation's annual GiveBIG, a 24-hour online giving campaign designed to support King County and Washington state nonprofit organizations, has raised more than $100 million from 400,000 individual donations to nearly 1,600 different organizations since 2011. In its sixth year, GiveBIG was extended an extra 24 hours due to technical difficulties with Kimbia, the fundraising platform used by dozens of community foundations across the country on May 3, 2016. The foundation's eighth and final GiveBIG campaign was held on May 9, 2018.

 June 23, 2011: $3.6 million
 May 2, 2012: $7.4 million
 May 15, 2013: $11.1 million
 May 6, 2014: $12.9 million
 May 5, 2015: $16.3 million
 May 3–4, 2016: $22 million 
 May 10, 2017: $19 million
May 9, 2018: $16.6 million

In November 2018, Seattle Foundation announced that GiveBIG 2019 would be run by 501 Commons, a Seattle-based nonprofit consulting service. The campaign was held May 8, 2019, raising $11.4 million.

References

External links 

Organizations based in Seattle
Community foundations based in the United States
Organizations established in 1946